Luis de la Cruz may refer to:

Luis de la Cruz (politician), Chilean politician
Luis de la Cruz (footballer), Paraguay footballer